Robert James Henderson (15 August 1877 – 24 April 1953) was a Progressive Conservative party member of the House of Commons of Canada. He was born in Brooke Township, Ontario and became a municipal clerk, farmer and teacher by career.

Henderson attended high school in Watford, Ontario and then the London Normal School. He taught school from 1899 to 1940.

He was first elected to Parliament at the Lambton—Kent riding in the 1945 general election, defeating Liberal party incumbent Hugh MacKenzie. After serving one term, the 20th Canadian Parliament, Henderson was defeated by MacKenzie in the 1949 election.

References

External links
 

1877 births
1953 deaths
Canadian farmers
Canadian schoolteachers
Members of the House of Commons of Canada from Ontario
Progressive Conservative Party of Canada MPs